The Minister for Medical Research  was a minister in the New South Wales Government and has responsibilities which included medical research in New South Wales, Australia.

History
The New South Wales government was involved in medical research since 1871 with the establishment of the position of Analytical Chemist. The NSW Medical Research Council was established on 18 September 1946 with objectives that included (1) carrying out a survey of medical research being conducted; (2) advising the government as to the expenditure of money upon medical research and the merits of reputed cures or methods of treatment. The Council however ceased to operate within a year of its establishment.

Medical Research was not represented at a portfolio level until 2003 with the creation of the portfolio of Science and Medical Research. The issues within the portfolio included gene technology; prohibition of human cloning and regulation of research on human embryos; access to Australia’s genetic and biochemical resources; bioethics; and spinal cord injury. The portfolio was combined with the Health portfolio in 2019 in the second Berejiklian ministry, named Health and Medical Research. The portfolio returned to Health in the second Perrottet ministry.

List of ministers

See also 

List of New South Wales government agencies

Notes

References

Medical Research